John Mark Johnston (born September 21, 1962) is an American former politician. He served in the South Dakota Senate from 2011 to 2013.

References

1962 births
Living people
Republican Party South Dakota state senators